Tsing Yi is an interchange station of the MTR between the Tung Chung line and Airport Express on Tsing Yi Island in Hong Kong. The station is located between Sunny Bay station and Lai King station on the Tung Chung Line, and between Airport station and Kowloon station on the Airport Express. The livery of the station is dull teal. Tsing Yi station is connected to a major interchange for buses and maxicabs, situated adjacent to the station, which serves as a public transport hub for the New Territories. It is embedded into the Maritime Square shopping centre.

History 
The station, built as part of the Lantau Airport Railway project, was constructed between December 1994 and March 1998 by Japanese contractor Maeda Corporation.

Tsing Yi station opened together with the Tung Chung Line on 22 June 1998. The Airport Express services commenced at the station two weeks later on 6 July.

Location 

Tsing Yi station is located in the northeastern quarter of the island of the same name, slightly to the west of Kowloon and mainland Hong Kong. To the west is Tsing Yi Town Park, while the Tsing Yi Sports Ground lies to the south. Otherwise, much of the area is residential with a number of educational establishments nearby.

Transit-oriented development 

As with other MTR stations, Tsing Yi is a prime site for transit-oriented development by the MTR Corporation, whose properties division develops land above and in the vicinity of its stations. Owing to its ideal location between Kowloon and Lantau Island, MTR Properties has heavily invested in commercial and residential development around Tsing Yi, the most prominent of this investment being Maritime Square, a large shopping centre extending from the station, and the residential estate Tierra Verde, which lies on top of the station. Maritime Square contains  of retail space, while the Tierra Verde complex comprises twelve residential towers and a total of 3,500 flats.

Morning express service 

The MTR offers morning express service allowing passengers to take the airport express from Tsing Yi to Hong Kong station. Commuters wishing to reach Hong Kong faster can use their Octopus card at dedicated gates for HK$20. This offer is available every day except Sundays and public holidays from 7 am to 10 am.

Station layout 

The station has four stories above ground level. The ground floor has a taxi stand outside and has access to the concourse on the first floor. The concourse is integrated with the Maritime Square shopping centre. The second floor houses the Tung Chung line platform for trains heading for Hong Kong station, and the third floor houses the Tung Chung line platform for services towards Tung Chung station. At the Airport Express departure and arrival platforms, there is a free WiFi hotspot available. Unlike at Kowloon and Hong Kong stations, in-town check-in facilities and free Airport Express shuttle buses are not available at this station.

As with other Airport Express stations, the Airport Express and Tung Chung line are separated with a different paid area for the Airport Express, thus passengers changing between two lines must go downstairs and past through floor U1, and then go upstairs again. In Tsing Yi station, the 4 platforms are constructed in a stacked arrangement, with platforms 1 and 3 above platforms 2 and 4.

Entrances and exits 

A1: Maritime Square 2 
A2: Tierra Verde/Maritime Square (Level 1) 
B: Tsing Yi Swimming Pool 
C: Public Transport Interchange/Tsing King Road 
F: Maritime Square (Level 3)
G: Maritime Square (Level 2)

Gallery

References

External links 

MTR stations in the New Territories
Tsing Yi
Railway stations in Hong Kong opened in 1998
Airport Express (MTR)
Tung Chung line
Extra areas operated by NT taxis